Roland Manookian (born 21 March 1980) is an actor most notable for his role as Zeberdee in the 2004 film The Football Factory, and as Craig Rolfe in Rise of the Footsoldier in 2007. He has also appeared in Guy Richie's Rocknrolla and Nick Love's Goodbye Charlie Bright and The Business. He has also appeared in episodes of The Bill in 1999 as Ben Glover.

Manookian, of Armenian descent, comes from London and has supported Millwall since he was young.

Filmography

Film

Television

References

External links

1980 births
Living people
British people of Armenian descent
English male film actors
English male television actors
Male actors from London
People from Westminster